Schmitz is a common German surname (smith).

Notable people with the surname "Schmitz" include:

Arnold Schmitz (1893–1980), German musicologist, Beethoven researcher
Bob Schmitz (1939–2004), American football player
Bruno Schmitz (1858–1916), German architect
Danny Schmitz (born 1955), American college baseball coach
Elisabeth Schmitz (1893–1977), German Lutheran theologian and teacher
Else Schmitz-Gohr (1901-1987) German composer and pianist
Eugene Schmitz (1864–1928), mayor of San Francisco at the time of the 1906 earthquake
Greg Dean Schmitz (born 1970), American online film journalist
Hector Aron Schmitz or Ettore Schmitz (1861–1928), birthname of the Italian author Italo Svevo
James H. Schmitz (1911–1981), American science fiction writer
Jim Schmitz, American college baseball coach
Johannes Andreas Schmitz (1621–1652), Dutch physician
John G. Schmitz (1930–2001), American presidential candidate
John Michael Schmitz (born 1999), American football player
Johnny Schmitz (1920–2011), American baseball player
Joseph E. Schmitz (born 1958), former US Department of Defense official and Blackwater executive
Kim Schmitz (born 1974), German entrepreneur
Leonhard Schmitz (1807–1890), German-born classical scholar and educator active mainly in the United Kingdom
Marc Schmitz (born 1963), German artist
Oliver Schmitz (born 1960), South African film director
Peter Schmitz (born 1954), United Nations official
Ralf Schmitz (born 1974), German actor
Richard Schmitz (1885–1954), mayor of Vienna, Austria
E. Robert Schmitz (1889–1949), Franco-American pianist and composer
Sabine Schmitz (1969–2021), German race driver
Sascha Schmitz (born 1972), German pop singer
Sigrid Schmitz (born 1961), German behavioral physiologist
Sybille Schmitz (1909–1955), German actress
Todd Schmitz (born 1978), American swimming coach

The following places bear the name Schmitz:

Schmitz Lake, lake in South Dakota
Schmitz Park (Seattle)
Schmitz Park Creek

See also

German-language surnames
Occupational surnames